Jack Bodell (11 August 1940 – 9 November 2016) was an English professional boxer, active during the 1960s and 1970s.

Born in Swadlincote, Derbyshire, Bodell started out as a light heavyweight, winning the 1961 ABA championships and a bronze medal at the European amateur championships the same year. He won the British heavyweight championship in 1969, before losing it to Henry Cooper in his first defence. Bodell regained the title a year later by outpointing Joe Bugner. He lost the European title in 1971 after a defeat by Spaniard José Manuel Urtaín, and after losing both his British and Commonwealth titles to a second-round knockout by Danny McAlinden in June 1972, he retired from professional boxing.

Among his other notable fights were a first-round knockout loss to Jerry Quarry after just 64 seconds, and a points win over future world title contender José Roman. Bodell's final record was 58 wins (including 31 by knockout) and 13 losses. He died on 9 November 2016 at the age of 76.

Professional boxing record

Trivia

Jack Bodell is mentioned in the "Boxing Tonight" sketch in episode 37 of Monty Python's Flying Circus, in which he (played by Nosher Powell) fights Sir Kenneth Clark (played by Graham Chapman).

References

External links

See also
 List of left-handed boxers

1940 births
2016 deaths
English male boxers
Heavyweight boxers
Light-heavyweight boxers
People from Swadlincote
Sportspeople from Derbyshire
Southpaw boxers
European Boxing Union champions